Rafael Sebastián Mujica García (born 29 October 1998) is a Spanish professional footballer who plays for Portuguese club Arouca. Mainly a forward, he can also play as a winger.

He represented Spain at under-19 level.

Club career

Barcelona
Born in Las Palmas, Canary Islands, Mújica joined FC Barcelona's youth setup on 19 May 2015, from UD Las Palmas. On 26 March 2016, aged only 17, he made his senior debut with the reserves by coming on as a late substitute for Juan Cámara in a 2–0 Segunda División B away win against CD Llosetense.

Mujica scored his first senior goal on 9 April 2016, netting his team's only strike in a 1–3 home loss against CE Sabadell FC. He played for the first team during the 2016–17 pre-season under manager Luis Enrique, including scoring against English side Leicester City in a 4–2 victory during a pre-season friendly on 4 August.

In February 2017, Mujica suffered a hamstring rupture which required surgery, which hampered his progress, keeping him sidelined for nine-and-a-half months and missing out the club's promotion in the play-offs. He made his professional debut on 6 January 2018, replacing Vitinho in a 1–1 away draw against Real Zaragoza in the Segunda División.

On 31 January 2018, Mujica was loaned to UE Cornellà in the third division, until June. He contributed with six goals in 16 matches for the side; highlights included scoring in the season's Copa Catalunya final in a 3–2 victory against UA Horta on 2 June, to help the club lift the trophy for the first time.

After his loan spell, Mujica returned to Barcelona, training with the first team during the summer of 2018. He returned to the B-team for the 2018–19 season, and played 33 games for the side scoring seven goals and providing one assist in Segunda División B during the season.

In January 2019, Mujica was also named by manager Ernesto Valverde in Barcelona's first team squad for the Copa del Rey fixture against Levante UD. On 27 June, Mújica announced on his official Twitter page he would be leaving Barcelona, and the club officially released him when his contract expired three days later.

Leeds United
On 4 July 2019, Leeds United announced the signing of Mujica on a three-year contract, running until the summer of 2022. He would initially be part of Carlos Corberán's under-23 team. A few days later, he played in the first team under manager Marcelo Bielsa in the club's first pre-season friendly, as a second-half substitute against York City in a 5–0 win.

On 23 August 2019, Mujica joined Extremadura UD in the Spanish Segunda División on a one-year loan deal, with the option to buy. He made his debut for the club on 1 September, in a 2–1 loss against Cádiz CF, but returned to his parent club early in January 2020, having made just seven league appearances for Extremadura.

On 24 January 2020, Mujica joined Villarreal CF on loan until the end of the season, being assigned to the B-team. On 26 August, he moved to second division club Real Oviedo on a season-long loan.

Las Palmas
On 1 February 2021, after leaving Oviedo early, Mujica joined his hometown club Las Palmas on loan until the end of the second-tier season. On 2 July, the move was made permanent for an undisclosed fee.

Arouca
On 21 June 2022, Mujica moved to Portuguese Primeira Liga side F.C. Arouca on a two-year deal.

International career
He has represented Spain at international level up to under-19s.

Career statistics

Honours
Barcelona
UEFA Youth League: 2017–18

Barcelona B
Segunda División B: 2016–17

UE Cornellà
Copa Catalunya: 2017–18

References

External links
FC Barcelona official profile

1998 births
Living people
Footballers from Las Palmas
Spanish footballers
Association football forwards
Segunda División players
Segunda División B players
FC Barcelona players
FC Barcelona Atlètic players
UE Cornellà players
Extremadura UD footballers
Villarreal CF B players
Real Oviedo players
Leeds United F.C. players
Primeira Liga players
F.C. Arouca players
Spain youth international footballers
Spanish expatriate footballers
Spanish expatriate sportspeople in England
Spanish expatriate sportspeople in Portugal
Expatriate footballers in England
Expatriate footballers in Portugal